The Bambuco Bridge was a temporary outdoor sculpture in the form of a simple suspension bridge spanning the River Tyne, England, made entirely from bamboo wood. The public art was designed and built for the SummerTyne festival, part of the NewcastleGateshead initiative.

History 
The 'bridge' was actually a sculpture and could not be used for human or vehicular transport. The sculpture opened for its three-day run at 10:00 on 18 July 2008, and closed on 20 July; the opening coincided with the start of the ten-day SummerTyne festival. There was a light show at 21:00 on 18 July to officially mark the occasion. After the three-day period, the bridge was dismantled in late July.

Newcastle upon Tyne and Gateshead commissioned the Australia-based firm Bambuco to create the bridge sculpture from 20 tonnes (in 800 pieces) of bamboo in 2008, the 80th anniversary of the construction of the Tyne Bridge. The sculpture's construction started in late June 2008. The founder of Bambuco, Simon Barley had the initial idea of a bamboo bridge over the Tyne, but died in 2007 before the project could be undertaken; Bambuco toyed with calling this bridge the Bridge of Si's, a play on Venice's Bridge of Sighs.

Image gallery

References

External links 

 Bambuco
 Bamboo bridge at Newcastle City Council
 Bamboo Bridge feature at BBC Tyne
 Opening night image gallery at The Journal

Outdoor sculptures in England
Wooden sculptures in the United Kingdom
2008 sculptures